This is a list of the gymnasts who represented their country at the 1956 Summer Olympics in Melbourne from 22 November to 8 December 1956. Only one discipline, artistic gymnastics, was included in the Games.

Female artistic gymnasts

Male artistic gymnasts

References 

Lists of gymnasts
Gymnastics at the 1956 Summer Olympics